A sensor is a device that measures a physical quantity and converts it into a signal which can be read by an observer or by an instrument.

Sensor may also refer to:

 Image sensor, in digital cameras, medical imaging equipment, night vision equipment
 Nokia Sensor, a software package
 Sensor (manga), a 2018 manga series by Junji Ito
 Sensor (album), a 2003 album by Camouflage
 Sensor (character), a fictional character
 SENSOR-Pesticides, a surveillance program
 Sensors (journal), a Swiss open access journal

See also
 Censer, any type of vessel made for burning incense
 Censor (disambiguation)
 Censure
 Senser, a UK band
 Sensors (disambiguation)